Marshall Field and Company Store is a building in Oak Park, Illinois that was added to the National Register of Historic Places on January 21, 1988.  It is one of the two locations (along with the Evanston location) that the company chose to expand to when it decided to add suburban stores.  The store is a miniature replica of the Marshall Field and Company Building in the Chicago Loop and a twin of the Evanston store.

The building served as a Marshall Field's store from its opening until 1986, when Marshall Field's then-owner BATUS Inc. closed it because it was deemed out of date and too costly to operate. The building housed a Borders book store, until all the locations were closed in 2011. Today, it houses several offices.

References

Oak Park, Illinois
Buildings and structures on the National Register of Historic Places in Cook County, Illinois
Art Deco architecture in Illinois
Commercial buildings on the National Register of Historic Places in Illinois
Marshall Field's